"A Boom shot, Jib shot, or Crane shot refer to high-angle shots, sometimes with the camera moving."

References

Film production
Television terminology